Browtop is a village in Cumbria, England.

It is also an area of Keswick where Francis Galton stayed (In Galton's biography, Karl Pearson states that "Browtop ... stands well upon the Thirlmere road before the old turnpike at the junction with the steep road down to the church is reached.")

Villages in Cumbria
Dean, Cumbria